
Gmina Szepietowo is an urban-rural gmina (administrative district) in Wysokie Mazowieckie County, Podlaskie Voivodeship, in north-eastern Poland.

(Before 1 January 2010, when Szepietowo became a town, the district was classed as a rural gmina.)

Villages
Apart from the town of Szepietowo, the gmina contains the villages and settlements of Chorążyce, Dąbrowa-Bybytki, Dąbrowa-Dołęgi, Dąbrowa-Gogole, Dąbrowa-Kaski, Dąbrowa-Łazy, Dąbrowa-Moczydły, Dąbrowa-Tworki, Dąbrowa-Wilki, Dąbrowa-Zabłotne, Dąbrówka Kościelna, Jabłoń-Kikolskie, Jabłoń-Samsony, Kamień-Rupie, Moczydły-Jakubowięta, Moczydły-Stanisławowięta, Nowe Gierałty, Nowe Szepietowo Podleśne, Nowe Warele, Nowe Zalesie, Plewki, Pułazie-Świerże, Średnica-Jakubowięta, Średnica-Maćkowięta, Średnica-Pawłowięta, Stare Gierałty, Stary Kamień, Stawiereje Podleśne, Stawiereje-Michałowięta, Szepietowo Podleśne, Szepietowo-Janówka, Szepietowo-Wawrzyńce, Szepietowo-Żaki, Szymbory-Andrzejowięta, Szymbory-Jakubowięta, Szymbory-Włodki, Warele-Filipowicze, Włosty-Olszanka, Wojny-Izdebnik, Wojny-Krupy, Wojny-Piecki, Wojny-Pietrasze, Wojny-Pogorzel, Wojny-Szuby Szlacheckie, Wojny-Szuby Włościańskie, Wojny-Wawrzyńce, Wyliny-Ruś, Wyszonki-Posele and Zabiele.

Neighbouring gminas
Gmina Szepietowo is bordered by the gminas of Brańsk, Czyżew-Osada, Klukowo, Nowe Piekuty and Wysokie Mazowieckie.

References

Polish official population figures 2006

Szepietowo
Wysokie Mazowieckie County